Colin David Daker (born 29 September 1935) is an English actor. He is best known for his role as Harry Crawford in the hit series Boon. He also played Tommy Mackay in Only Fools and Horses and Jarvis in Porridge.

He has made two appearances in Minder, the first in the second episode of the second series (Who's Wife Is It Anyway) in which he played Alex, an owner of an antique shop; his second appearance being in the second episode of the sixth series (Life In The Fast Food Lane) in which he played Sir Ronald Bates, the tyrannical owner of a fast food chain. He also appeared in Kill Two Birds, a 1976 episode of Thriller as Charlie Draper, a released prisoner who finds himself embroiled in an attempt to recover stolen loot, as Dave Ryman, an ex-colleague of James Hazell, in a 1978 episode (Hazell and the Rubber-Heel Brigade) of the series Hazell, and as Jim Brent, father of baby David, in That's My Boy, a 1977 episode of Rising Damp.

In film, he played young Kevin's father in Time Bandits (1981) and the desk sergeant in I Bought a Vampire Motorcycle (1990).

Early life
Bilston-born Daker attended Etheridge Secondary Modern School, now called Moseley Park School, in the West Midlands.

Filmography

Film

Television

References

External links
 

1935 births
English male soap opera actors
Actors from Staffordshire
Living people
20th-century English male actors
21st-century English male actors
People from Bilston